Cape St. Claire, a suburb of Annapolis, is a covenanted, unincorporated community as well as a census-designated place (CDP) in Anne Arundel County, Maryland, United States. While the community of Cape St. Claire lies entirely within the CDP and accounts for approximately 80% of the homes and residents, the CDP also includes the smaller communities of Atlantis, Walnut Ridge, Green Holly, and St. Claire Court. The population of the CDP was 8,747 at the 2010 census.

Contained within Cape St. Claire are three marinas, multiple parks and beaches, a shopping center, Broadneck High School, Cape St. Claire Elementary School, The Harbour School, and Cape St. Claire Swim Club. Fire protection is provided by the Cape St. Claire Volunteer Fire Company. There are many churches located in the community including: Broadneck Baptist Church, Cape St. Claire United Methodist Church and Christ Our Anchor Presbyterian Church and Saint Andrew By the Bay Roman Catholic Church.

Geography
Cape St. Claire is located at  (39.042910, −76.445623). The CDP is bounded to the east by the Little Magothy River, to the north by the Magothy River, to the west by Deep Creek, and to the south by College Parkway. U.S. Route 50 runs just to the south of the CDP, leading west  to Annapolis and east  to the Chesapeake Bay Bridge.

Demographics

As of the census of 2000, there were 8,022 people, 2,857 households, and 2,179 families residing in the CDP. The racial makeup of the CDP was 92.98% White, 3.84% African American, 0.11% Native American, 1.13% Asian, 0.07% Pacific Islander, 0.65% from other races, and 1.21% from two or more races. Hispanic or Latino of any race were 2.13% of the population.

There were 2,856 households, out of which 41.7% had children under the age of 18 living with them, 62.5% were married couples living together, 10.3% had a female householder with no husband present, and 23.7% were non-families. 18.2% of all households were made up of individuals, and 6.2% had someone living alone who was 65 years of age or older. The average household size was 2.79 and the average family size was 3.19.

In the CDP, the population was spread out, with 28.6% under the age of 18, 6.4% from 18 to 24, 32.7% from 25 to 44, 25.2% from 45 to 64, and 7.1% who were 65 years of age or older. The median age was 36 years. For every 100 females, there were 98.3 males. For every 100 females age 18 and over, there were 93.1 males.

The median income for a household in the CDP was $72,000, and the median income for a family was $76,657. Males had a median income of $50,133 versus $32,212 for females. The per capita income for the CDP was $27,009. About 1.4% of families and 2.6% of the population were below the poverty line, including 2.2% of those under age 18 and 13.7% of those age 65 or over.

History 
The area that was to become Cape St. Claire was mostly farmland until the 1940s. In the late 18th century, much of the land was operated as farmland by a couple of families. Two houses from this era remain—the "Stinchcomb House" located near the Cape St. Claire clubhouse, and Goshen Farm, located on a hill near the Cape St. Claire Elementary School.

In the early part of the 20th century, Hugh H. Young, a prominent doctor on the staff of Johns Hopkins University, began buying up the farmland with the intention of building a community. Dr. Young's first attempt, a community called Persimmon Point, was less than successful, with only a few lots being sold. This failure was brought on by the Great Depression, and the project was put on hold. Upon Dr. Young's death, his children created the River Bay Company to manage the property for development.

The River Bay Company platted the community of Cape St. Claire (incorporating the Persimmon Point property as part of the new community) on June 14, 1949. The community was envisioned and sold as a summer retreat for residents of Washington, D.C., and Baltimore. To manage the affairs of the new community, the River Bay Company created and incorporated the Cape St. Claire Club, governed by a Board of Governors. The first meeting of the Board of Governors of the Cape St. Claire Club (renamed the Cape St. Claire Improvement Association on May 12, 1959) was held on June 30, 1949. The Board consisted of three representatives of the River Bay Company named in the Cape St. Claire Club certificate of incorporation: John G. Rouse, Jr.; James C. Morton, Jr.; and George W. Baker, Jr. James C. Morton was elected Chairman.

In April 1989, the Anne Arundel County Council approved the formation of the Cape St. Claire Special Community Benefits District. The SCBD allows the community to establish a taxing district. The taxes are collected by the county government (as part of the property tax), which are then turned over to the Improvement Association to administer as voted on by the property owners in the community. This special benefits district has allowed the community to purchase additional common property, build a specially-designated fishing/crabbing pier, make improvements to community assets, and hire off-duty county police for additional security.

See also
St. Margaret's, Maryland

References

External links

Census-designated places in Maryland
Census-designated places in Anne Arundel County, Maryland
Populated places established in 1949
1949 establishments in Maryland
Maryland populated places on the Chesapeake Bay
Suburbs of Annapolis, Maryland